Piri Wiri Tua can be:

A pseudonym used by Tahupotiki Wiremu Ratana, founder of the Ratana religion
The Piri Wiri Tua Movement, a political party based on the Ratana religion